Francis Kerbiriou (born 11 May 1951) is a former athlete from France who competed mainly in the 400 meters. He won the 1973 and 1975 French Athletics Championships in the 400 meters.

He competed for a France in the 1972 Summer Olympics held in Munich, Germany in the 4 x 400 metre relay where he won the bronze medal with his team mates Gilles Bertould, Daniel Velasques and Jacques Carette.

References

Sports Reference

1951 births
Living people
French male sprinters
Olympic bronze medalists for France
Athletes (track and field) at the 1972 Summer Olympics
Athletes (track and field) at the 1976 Summer Olympics
Olympic athletes of France
Medalists at the 1972 Summer Olympics
Olympic bronze medalists in athletics (track and field)
20th-century French people
21st-century French people